The 2015 European U23 Judo Championships is an edition of the European U23 Judo Championships, organised by the European Judo Union. It was held in Bratislava, Slovakia from 13 to 15 November 2015.

Medal summary

Medal table

Men's events

Women's events

Source Results

References

External links
 

European U23 Judo Championships
 U23
European Championships, U23
Judo
Judo competitions in Slovakia
Judo
Judo, European Championships U23